Lamon Dezjon Archey (born April 9, 1981) is an American actor best known for his role in The CW All American  and soap opera, Days of Our Lives.

Early life
Born in 1981, Archey was raised in San Mateo, California by his grandparents. Archey played baseball and football during his first two years of high school. Archey has had very little contact with his father, who died when he was 20 years old. After high school, Archey worked as a carpenter installing floors for two years. He then moved to Los Angeles with his uncle where he found work as an emergency medical technician. Archey has 12 tattoos.

Career
Living in Los Angeles, Archey took up modeling after he was scouted at a job fair. He credits modeling with helping him break out of his shell. He was later advised by manager Michael Bruno to get into acting classes so he could get a gig on a soap. After about two years of acting classes with no results, Archey was ready to give up when he booked two under-five roles on Days of Our Lives. In December 2012, Archey was cast in the recurring role of Mason Wilder on The Young and the Restless. Archey vacated the role in early 2014. In 2016, Archey returned to Days of Our Lives in the newly created contract role of Eli Grant. He appeared onscreen in February 2017. In March 2017, Archey appeared in the television film Can't Buy Love.

In 2020, Archey was cast as a guest-star in the season 2 finale of The CW's All American. He would play D'Angelo Carter. In December 2020, it was announced that Archey would reprise his role in season 3 in a recurring capacity.

Filmography

References

External links
 

1981 births
People from San Mateo, California
Male models from California
American male soap opera actors
American male television actors
21st-century American male actors
Living people
African-American male actors
21st-century African-American people
20th-century African-American people